Jacob Blomqvist (born November 8, 1986) is a Swedish professional ice hockey centre who currently plays for Brynäs IF of the Swedish Hockey League (SHL).

He has formerly played with Modo Hockey, Leksands IF and Timrå IK in the SHL. During the 2016–17 season, on November 22, 2016, Blomqvist agreed to a three-year contract extension to remain with Brynäs IF through 2020.

References

External links

1986 births
Living people
Bofors IK players
Brynäs IF players
Leksands IF players
Modo Hockey players
Swedish ice hockey centres
Timrå IK players